Ladybank railway station serves the town of Ladybank in Fife, Scotland.

History 
The latter branch was subsequently extended to Hilton Junction, near Perth the following year. On 8 June 1857, the Fife and Kinross Railway opened, providing a link to Kinross. This line was closed to passengers on 5 June 1950, with the line between Auchtermuchty and Ladybank closing to freight on 29 January 1957.

Passenger trains were also withdrawn on the Perth branch (as far as ) on 19 September 1955 by the British Transport Commission, the route having been reduced to single track (with a loop at ) by the London and North Eastern Railway in 1933.  The line was retained for freight traffic and was subsequently reopened to passengers in 1975 to provide a shorter route between Perth & Edinburgh than that via Stirling (the direct route from  via Kinross having been closed in 1970 to free up part of the alignment for the planned M90 motorway).

Facilities
The station has a ticket office on platform 2, but this is only staffed on a limited basis (mornings only, Mondays to Saturdays).  At other times tickets must be purchased on board the train.  The main building on platform 1 is now used as an art studio.  Standard shelters are available on both platforms, along with a waiting room on platform 1. Train running information is provided via CIS displays, automatic announcements and customer help points.  The station subway has steps and is not therefore accessible to wheelchair or mobility-impaired users, but there are step-free access routes to each side via public roads. All trains on the route to and from Perth use platform 1 in both directions, so this should be taken into account if changing trains here.

Services 
The single track nature of this line limits the frequency of services possible to and from Perth, though track upgrades & replacement work has improved matters somewhat by reducing the end-to-end journey time between here and Hilton Junction. On Sundays, most trains run between Edinburgh & Perth, though a few Aberdeen services call in the morning & evening.
Ladybank Junction is signalled from Edinburgh IECC.

References

Notes

Sources
 
 
 

Railway stations in Fife
Former North British Railway stations
Railway stations in Great Britain opened in 1847
Railway stations served by ScotRail
Listed railway stations in Scotland
Category B listed buildings in Fife
1847 establishments in Scotland
Ladybank